Fred Wilmot (April 15, 1927 – October 27, 2009) was a Canadian football player who played for the Calgary Stampeders and Montreal Alouettes. He won the Grey Cup with the Stampeders in 1948. He previously played football for the McGill University Redmen. He later worked in the construction industry and served as managing director of Kananaskis Country. He died in 2009.

Fred Wilmot played junior football with future Premier Peter Lougheed with the Calgary Tornadoes.

References

1927 births
2009 deaths
Canadian football people from Calgary
Players of Canadian football from Alberta
Calgary Stampeders players
Montreal Alouettes players
McGill Redbirds football players